Xuntian, also known as the Chinese Survey Space Telescope  (CSST) is a planned Chinese space telescope currently under development. It will feature a 2 meter (6.6 foot) diameter primary mirror and is expected to have a field of view 300–350 times larger than the Hubble Space Telescope. This will allow the telescope to image up to 40 percent of the sky using its 2.5 gigapixel camera over ten years. 

Xuntian is scheduled for launch in 2024 on a Long March 5B rocket to co-orbit with the Tiangong space station in slightly different orbital phases, which will allow for periodic docking with the station.

See also
 Hubble Space Telescope
 James Webb Space Telescope
 Nancy Grace Roman Space Telescope
 Lists of telescopes

Notes

References

2024 in spaceflight
2024 in China
Satellites of China
Chinese telescopes
Proposed satellites
Chinese space stations